Rear Admiral Charles Stillman Sperry (September 3, 1847February 1, 1911) was an officer in the United States Navy.

Born in Brooklyn, New York, Sperry graduated from the Naval Academy in 1866. As a rear admiral, he served in the United States delegation to the Geneva Convention and the Second Hague Conference, and as Commander in Chief, Battle Fleet, he led the Great White Fleet during the major portion of its historic cruise around the world in 1908 and 1909. 

Sperry retired September 3, 1909, but subsequently was recalled to active duty for special service. He died February 1, 1911, in Washington, D.C.

The destroyer  was named for him.

References

Further reading
 Siege of Baler

External links

 
 

1847 births
1911 deaths
Burials at Arlington National Cemetery
Naval War College alumni
Presidents of the Naval War College
United States Navy admirals